Caitlin Peel Farrell (born September 29, 1997) is a former American soccer player who played professionally as a forward for Orlando Pride in the NWSL.

Early life 
Farrell was a three-sport athlete at Choate Rosemary Hall, playing soccer, basketball and lacrosse. An All-America selection by the National Soccer Coaches Association of America (NSCAA) in 2014, she was selected to play in the high school All-America game. She also played club soccer with Connecticut FC ECNL and the Region I Olympic Development Program.

Georgetown Hoyas 
Farrell played collegiate soccer at Georgetown University where she won three consecutive Big East Conference titles and made two appearances at the NCAA Women's College Cup finals in 2016 and 2018. In her senior year, Farrell was third in the nation for goals with a career-high 18, unanimously named Big East Offensive Player of the Year and was nominated as a MAC Hermann Trophy finalist alongside Jordan DiBiasi and Catarina Macario. In total, Farrell appeared in all 92 of Georgetown's games (75 starts) scoring 30 goals and 19 assists.

Professional career

Orlando Pride 
Despite registering for the 2019 NWSL College Draft, Farrell was not selected to the surprise of many analysts. In March she joined Orlando Pride's preseason camp as a non-roster invitee and was signed to the team's supplemental roster on April 10. After finishing school during the early part of the season, she made her professional debut on May 25, 2019, as a substitute away at Utah Royals FC. In doing so she became the youngest Pride player to date, beating Erin Greening's record set earlier in the season by 60 days. Farrell finished her debut season with three appearances for a combined 15 minutes. Having not joined the Pride in 2020 preseason, Farrell was officially removed from the roster ahead of the Fall Series in September for failure to report. She had been working as a paralegal since June.

Career statistics

Honors

College

Georgetown Hoyas

 Big East Conference Women's Soccer Tournament: 2016, 2017, 2018

Individual 

 Big East Conference Offensive Player of the Year: 2018
United Soccer Coaches First Team All-America: 2018
 MAC Hermann Trophy Finalist: 2018

References

External links 

 NWSL profile
 Georgetown bio

1997 births
Living people
American women's soccer players
Georgetown Hoyas women's soccer players
Orlando Pride players
National Women's Soccer League players
Soccer players from Connecticut
People from Wallingford, Connecticut
Women's association football forwards